The proposal of establishing a national park system of China was released in 2013 at the 3rd Plenary Session of the 18th Central Committee of the Chinese Communist Party. In 2016, the Three-River-Source National Park was established as the first experimental unit of this park system. Fujian Wuyi Mountains National Park was established in the same year, and 9 more parks have been designated since then. Currently, the National Park System of China has 11 units. They are administered by the National Forestry and Grassland Administration.

List of National Parks

List of National Park pilot sites

National Scenic and Historic Interest Areas 
National Scenic and Historic Interest Areas in China were officially approved and declared by the State Council. The Ministry of Housing and Urban-Rural Development is in charge of the supervision and administration of national and provincial parks throughout the country. To date, China has 244 National Scenic and Historic Interest Areas. The ranges and boundaries of these national parks are often extended beyond what the official names might suggest. The National Scenic and Historic Interest Areas system still exists after the establishment of national parks in 2016.

See also

List of national parks
Protected areas of China

References 

 
National parks
China
Cultural heritage of China
Protected areas of China
Parks